WKCQ (98.1 FM) is a radio station licensed to Saginaw, Michigan, and broadcasting on 98.1 mHz with an effective radiated power of 50,000 watts. The station has broadcast a popular country music format since 1968 (the country format began under the station's original calls of WSAM-FM).

Every year since 1992, the station hosts a free concert on Ojibway Island in downtown Saginaw. Under the right conditions it can be heard all the way in Port Sanilac.  For a period of time, WKCQ's listenership in the Flint area declined when WFBE, with which it competes with in Genesee County, Michigan, switched to country, however listenership has rebounded in the Flint area due to the stability of its on-air talent, with Jim Kramer, Kevin Profitt, Greg Cole and Brian Bailey, among others, having been with the station for a decade or more.  It is also one of the highest-rated radio stations in the Great Lakes Bay region, where it competes with WCEN-FM.  Nearby competition also includes WITL-FM in Lansing in Shiawassee County, Michigan.

Sources
Michiguide.com - WKCQ History

External links

KCQ-FM
Country radio stations in the United States
Radio stations established in 1968